Be He Me is the debut album by Annuals, released on October 17, 2006 under Ace Fu Records. Recorded at Magic Shop Recording Studios in SoHo, NY.

Track listing

2006 debut albums
Ace Fu Records albums